The 7.5 cm kanon PL vz. 37 (Anti-aircraft Gun Model 37) was a Czech anti-aircraft gun used in World War II. Those weapons captured after the German occupation of Czechoslovakia in March 1939 were taken into Wehrmacht service as the 7.5 cm Flak M 37(t) or Flak Skoda. The Germans sold many of them to Italy where they were designated as the Cannone da 75/49 or 75/50. Surviving guns were taken back into German service after Italy's surrender in 1943. Twenty were sold to the Finns in November 1940. Twelve were in Luftwaffe service between April and September 1944.

Description
The gun had a semi-automatic, vertical sliding-block breech that automatically ejected the cartridge case after firing, but had to be hand-loaded for the next shot. It had a standard hydro-pneumatic recoil system and a muzzle brake. It could fire a  armor-piercing shell for direct fire. It was intended for motor towing as it rode on a two-axle carriage with pneumatic wheels, but could be towed by horses if necessary. The side legs of the cruciform mount folded for transport.

Notes

References
 Gander, Terry and Chamberlain, Peter. Weapons of the Third Reich: An Encyclopedic Survey of All Small Arms, Artillery and Special Weapons of the German Land Forces 1939–1945. New York: Doubleday, 1979 
 Kliment, Charles K. and Nakládal, Bretislav. Germany's First Ally: Armed Forces of the Slovak State 1939–1945. Atglen, PA: Schiffer, 1997

External links

 The Kanon PL vz. 37 in Finnish service

World War II anti-aircraft guns
World War II artillery of Italy
75 mm artillery
World War II artillery of Germany
Anti-aircraft guns of Czechoslovakia
Military equipment introduced in the 1930s